This is a list of radio stations in Russian.

Moscow

UKV 

Radio Rossii (VGTRK) 5:00-1:00 66.44 FM - News and talk radio
Radio Radonezh 72.92 FM - religious radio

FM 

Business FM 87.5 FM - All-news radio
Like FM (Gazprom-Media) 87.9 FM - Interactive music radio
Retro FM (EMG) 88.3 FM - Russian and Western 60-90s pop and rock hits
Yumor FM (Gazprom-Media) 88.7 FM - Russian contemporary pop music
Radio Jazz (Multimedia Holding) 89.1 FM - Contemporary jazz music
Megapolis FM 89.5 FM - House music
Radio Tvoya Volna 89.9 FM - Russian pop
AvtoRadio (Gazprom-Media) 90.3 FM - Adult contemporary
Relax FM (Gazprom-Media) 90.8 FM - Music for relaxation
Radio Sputnik (Rossiya Segodnya) 91.2 FM - News/talk
Radio Kultura (VGTRK) 91.6 FM - Classical
Moskva FM (Moscow Media) 92.0 FM - Moscow city radio
Radio Dacha (SAFMAR Media) 92.4 FM - Russian and Soviet pop hits
Radio Karnaval (EKOR) 92.8 FM - Pop and rock hits
Studio 21 (EMG) 93.2 FM - Hip-Hop & R&B music
Kommersant FM 93.6 FM - News/Talk
Vostok FM (SAFMAR Media) 94.0 FM
Pervoe Sportivnoe (SAFMAR Media) 94.4 FM - Sport/Oldies
Govorit Moskva (SAFMAR Media) 94.8 FM - Talk/Oldies
ROCK FM (Multimedia Holding) 95.2 FM - Classic rock
Radio Zvezda 95.6 FM - Russian pop and rock music
Dorognoye Radio (EMG) 96.0 FM - Russian old music
Taxi FM (SAFMAR Media) 96.4 FM
Detskoye Radio (Gazprom Media) 96.8 FM - Radio for kids (mostly music)
Radio KP 97.2 FM - News/talk
Vesti FM (VGTRK) 97.6 FM - News 24x7
Radio Chocolate (Rumedia) 98.0 FM - Radio for women
Novoe radio (EMG) 98.4 FM - Russian pop music
Radio Romantika (Gazprom-Media) 98.8 FM - Russian pop music
Radio Orpheus 99.2 FM - Classical
Radio Russkiy hit (SAFMAR Media) 99.6 FM - Contemporary pop
Silver Rain Radio 100.1 FM - Various
Zhara FM 100.5 FM - Pop music, Adult contemporary
Radio Vera 100.9 FM - Religious
DFM (RMG) 101.2 FM - Dance/Pop
Nashe Radio (Multimedia Holding) 101.7 FM - Russian rock
Radio Monte Carlo (RMG) 102.1 FM - Adult contemporary
Comedy Radio (Gazprom Media) 102.5 FM - Comedy Club Radio
Radio Shanson (SAFMAR Media) 103.0 FM - Russian Shanson
Radio Mayak (VGTRK) 103.4 FM - Talk radio
Radio MAXIMUM (RMG) 103.7 FM - Rock music
NRJ Russia (Gazprom-Media) 104.2 FM - European and Russian pop music
Radio 7 (EMG) 104.7 FM - Rock and pop hits (classical music hits on the top of each hour)
Radio Kniga (Dom Muzyki)/Radio 1 (Podmoskovie Media) 105.0 FM - Cultural and Education
Capital FM (Moscow Media) 105.3 FM - Pop music, Adult contemporary
Russian Radio (RMG) 105.7 FM - Russian pop music
Europa Plus (EMG) 106.2 FM - Pop music
Love Radio (SAFMAR Media) 106.6 FM - Top 40
Radio Izvestia (National Media Group) 107.0 FM - relaying of the TV channel "Izvestia"
Hit FM (RMG) 107.4 FM - Contemporary Hits
Militseyskaya Volna 107.8 FM - Russian pop

St. Petersburg

UKV 

Radio Rossii (VGTRK) 66.30 FM 5:00-1:00 - News and talk radio
Radio Petersburg (National Media Group 72,4%) 69.47 FM 6:00-1:00  - St.Petersburg radio
Radio Orpheus 71.66 FM - Classical
Radio Grad Petrov 73.10 FM - Religious

FM 

Dorozhnoye Radio (EMG) 87.5 FM - Russian Pop music and news
Retro FM (EMG) 88.0 FM - Russian and Western 60-90s pop and rock hits
AvtoRadio (Gazprom-Media) 88.4 FM - Music and talk
Yumor FM (Gazprom-Media) 88.9 FM - Russian contemporary pop music
Vesti FM (VGTRK) 89.3 FM - Talk radio
Radio Zenit (Gazprom-Media) 89.7 FM - Sport news and music
Radio Hermitage 90.1 FM - Contemporary jazz music and Big Bands
Radio Vanya (M10 Media) 90.6 FM - Russian Pop
Novoe radio (EMG) 91.1 FM - Russian pop music
Radio Sputnik (Rossiya Segodnya) 91.5 FM - News/talk
Radio KP 92.0 FM - News/talk
Hit FM (RMG) 92.4 FM - Contemporary Hits
Radio Vera 92.9 FM - Religious
(planned) Radio Kniga 93.3 FM - Cultural and Education
Radio Zvezda 94.1 FM - Russian pop and rock music
NRJ Russia (Gazprom-Media) 95.0 FM
Studio 21 (EMG) 95.5 FM - Hip-Hop & R&B music
Comedy Radio (Gazprom Media) 95.9 FM - Comedy Club Radio
Radio Dacha (SAFMAR Media) 97.0 FM
Royal Radio 98.6 FM
Radio Rossii (VGTRK) 99.0 FM - News/Talk
Popular classic (M10 Media) 100.1 FM (Simagino) - Classic music
Europa Plus (EMG) 100.5 FM - Pop music
Piter FM (M10 Media) 100.9 FM
Eldoradio (EMG) 101.4 FM - Hits from 60s to 90s
Radio Tvoya Volna 102.0 FM - Russian pop
Radio Metro 102.4 FM
Radio MAXIMUM (RMG) 102.8 FM - Rock music
DFM (RMG) 103.4 FM - Dance/R'n'B
Detskoye Radio (Gazprom-Media) 103.7 FM - Child Music
Nashe Radio (Multimedia Holding) 104.0 FM - Russian rock
Radio Shanson (SAFMAR Media) 104.4 FM - Russian Shanson
Like FM (Gazprom-Media) 104.8 FM - Interactive music radio
Love Radio (SAFMAR Media) 105.3 FM - Pop music
Radio Monte Carlo (RMG) 105.9 FM - Pop music
Radio Record 106.3 FM - Dance and Club music
Radio Mayak (VGTRK) 107.0 FM - Talk radio
Business FM (Rumedia) 107.4 FM - Talk radio
Russian Radio (RMG) 107.8 FM - Russian pop music

MW 

Radio Radonezh 19:00-0:00 684 MW - Religious
Radio Maria 8:00-0:00 1053 MW - Religious

Novosibirsk 

(planned) Radio Orpheus 88.6 FM - Classical
(planned) Like FM (Gazprom-Media) 89.1 FM - Interactive music radio
Radio 7 (EMG) 92.8 FM - Rock and pop hits (classical music hits on the top of each hour)
(planned) Radio Kniga 93.2 FM - Cultural and Education
Radio Mayak (VGTRK) 93.8 FM - Talk radio
Love Radio (SAFMAR Media) 94.2 FM - Top 40
Radio Vera - 94.6 FM
Radio MIR - 95.0 FM
Nashe Radio (Multimedia Holding) - 95.4 FM
Detskoye Radio (Gazprom Media) 95.8 FM - Radio for kids (mostly music)
Russian Radio (RMG) 96.2 FM - Russian pop music
Silver Rain Radio - 96.6 FM
Retro FM (EMG) 97.0 FM - Russian and Western 60-90s pop and rock hits
Comedy Radio (Gazprom Media) 97.4 FM - Comedy Club Radio
Radio Rossia (VGTRK) 97.8 FM - News/Talk radio
Radio KP 98.3 FM - News/talk
AvtoRadio (Gazprom-Media) 98.7 FM - Adult contemporary
NRJ Russia (Gazprom-Media) 99.1 FM - European and Russian pop music
Yumor FM (Gazprom-Media) 99.5 FM - Russian contemporary pop music
Novoe radio (EMG) 100.0 FM - Russian pop music
Radio Uniton - 100.7 FM
City Wave - 101.4 FM
Dorognoye Radio (EMG) 102.0 FM - Russian old music
Radio Record 102.6 FM - Dance and Club music
Europa Plus (EMG) 103.2 FM - Pop music
DFM (RMG) 103.9 FM - Dance/Pop
Vesti FM (VGTRK) 104.6 FM - News 24x7
Hit FM (RMG) 105.2 FM - Contemporary Hits
Business FM (Rumedia) 105.7 FM - Talk radio
Radio 54 - 106.2 FM
Radio Dacha (SAFMAR Media) 106.7 FM - Russian and Soviet pop hits
Relax FM (Gazprom-Media) 107.7 FM - Music for relaxation

Yekaterinburg

UKV 

Radio Orpheus 69.92 FM - Culture radio
Radio Voskreseniye 72.83 FM - Religious

FM 

Radio Zvezda 87.6 FM
Hit FM (RMG) 88.3 FM - Contemporary Hits
Silver Rain Radio - 88.8 FM
Detsckoe Radio (Gazprom Media) - 89.2 FM
NRJ Russia (Gazprom-Media) - 89.6 FM
Novoe radio (EMG) 90.8 FM - Russian pop music
Radio Record - 91.9 FM - Dance radio
Radio KP - 92.3 FM
Studio 21 (EMG) 92.7 FM - Hip-Hop & R&B music
Radio Vera - 93.7 FM
Dorozhnoe radio (EMG) - 94.2 FM - Oldies
Nashe Radio (Multimedia Holding) - 94.8 FM
Radio Rossia (VGTRK) 95.5 FM - News/Talk radio
Comedy Radio (Gazprom Media) 95.9 FM - Comedy Club Radio
Vesti FM (VGTRK) - 96.3 FM
Radio MIR - 97.9 FM
Love radio (SAFMAR Media) - 98.5 FM
Radio Leto (EKOR) - 98.9 FM - Pop music
Business FM (Rumedia) 99.4 FM - Business news
Retro FM (EMG) 100.0 FM - Russian and Western 60-90s pop and rock hits
Radio Pilot (EKOR) - 100.4 FM
Radio Mayak (VGTRK) 100.8 FM - Talk radio
Europa Plus (EMG) 101.2 FM - Pop music
Yumor FM 102.0 FM (Gazprom-Media) - Russian contemporary pop music
Jam FM (EKOR) 102.5 FM - Disco radio
Radio Shanson (SAFMAR Media) 103.2 FM - Russian Shanson
Radio C (EKOR) 103.7 FM - Adult contemporary
Radio Dacha (SAFMAR Media) - 104.1 FM
Rock Arsenal (EKOR) 104.5 FM - Rock music
Avtoradio (Gazprom-Media) 105.0 FM - Adult contemporary
Russian Radio (RMG) 105.7 FM - Russian pop music
Radio Monte Carlo (RMG) 106.2 FM - Adult contemporary
Sputnik FM (EKOR) 107.0 FM
Gorod FM 107.6 FM - News/Talk Radio

Kazan

UKV 
Kuray radiosi - 73.97 FM

FM 

Silver Rain Radio - 88.3 FM
Dorognoye Radio (EMG) 88.9 FM - Russian old music
Detskoye Radio (Gazprom Media) 89.3 FM - Radio for kids (mostly music)
Radio Shanson (SAFMAR Media) - 89.7 FM - Russian Shanson
Radio Dacha (SAFMAR Media) 90.2 FM - Russian and Soviet pop hits
Russian Radio (RMG) 90.7 FM - Russian pop music
Yumor FM (Gazprom-Media) 91.1 FM - Russian contemporary pop music
Bolgar radiosi - 91.5 FM
Studio 21 (EMG) 91.9 FM - Hip-Hop & R&B music
NRJ Russia (Gazprom-Media) 92.3 FM - European and Russian pop music
Tartip radiosi (Tatmedia) 93.1 FM
Business FM (Rumedia) - 93.5 FM - Talk radio
Radio Mayak (VGTRK) 93.9 FM - Talk radio
Vesti FM (VGTRK) 94.3 FM - News 24x7
Radio Vera - 95.5 FM
Nashe Radio (Multimedia Holding) 96.8 FM - Russian rock
(planned) Radio Kniga 97.2 FM - Cultural and Education
Radio KP 98.0 FM - News/talk
Kitap radiosi (Tatmedia) 98.6 FM - Literature, Cultural
Radio Rossia (VGTRK) 99.2 FM - News/Talk radio
Tatar radiosi - 100.5 FM
Radio MIR - 100.9 FM
Novoe radio (EMG) 101.3 FM - Russian pop music
Radio Record 101.9 FM - Dance music
Retro FM (EMG) 102.4 FM - Russian and Western 60-90s pop and rock hits
BIM-Radio - 102.8 FM
AvtoRadio (Gazprom-Media) 103.3 FM - Adult contemporary
Radio Iskatel 104.0 FM
DFM (RMG) 104.7 FM - Dance/Pop
Relax FM (Gazprom-Media) 105.3 FM - Music for relaxation
Radio Sputnik (Rossiya Segodnya) 105.8 FM - News/talk
Radio Monte-Carlo (RMG) 106.3 FM
Europa Plus (EMG) 106.8 FM - Pop music
Radio Millenium - 107.3 FM
Love Radio (SAFMAR Media) 107.8 FM - Top 40

Nizhniy Novgorod 

Radio Mayak (VGTRK) 92.4 FM - Talk radio
Radio KP 92.8 FM - News/talk
Nashe Radio (Multimedia Holding) 93.5 FM - Russian rock
Radio Rossia (VGTRK) 93.9 FM - News/Talk radio
Relax FM (Gazprom-Media) 94.7 FM - Music for relaxation
Marusia FM 95.6 FM
Novoe radio (EMG) 96.0 FM - Russian pop-music
Radiola (Media-1) 96.4 FM - Oldies hits 60-80s
NRJ Russia (Gazprom-Media) 96.8 FM - European and Russian pop music
(planned) Radio Kniga 97.6 FM - Cultural and Education
Radio Obraz 98.0 FM - Religious
Vesti FM (VGTRK) 98.6 FM - News 24x7
Detskoye Radio (Gazprom Media) 99.1 FM - Radio for kids (mostly music)
Comedy Radio (Gazprom Media) 99.5 FM - Comedy Club Radio
Radio 7 (EMG) 100.0 FM - Rock and pop hits (classical music hits on the top of each hour)
Silver Rain Radio - 100.4 FM
Radio Record 100.9 FM - Dance music
Hit FM (RMG) 101.4 FM - Contemporary Hits
AvtoRadio (Gazprom-Media) 101.9 FM - Adult contemporary
Radio Monte Carlo (RMG) 102.4 FM - Pop music
Russian Radio (RMG) 102.9 FM - Russian pop music
Radio Randevu - 103.4 FM
Europa Plus (EMG) 103.9 FM - Pop music
Radio Dacha (SAFMAR Media) 104.5 FM - Russian and Soviet pop hits
Love Radio (SAFMAR Media) 104.9 FM - Top 40
Dorognoye Radio (EMG) 105.4 FM - Russian old music
Radio Rodnykh Dorog 105.9 FM
Retro FM (EMG) 106.4 FM - Russian and Western 60-90s pop and rock hits
Radio Shanson (SAFMAR Media) 106.9 FM - Russian Shanson
Yumor FM (Gazprom-Media) 107.4 FM - Russian contemporary pop music
Business FM (Rumedia) 107.8 FM - Talk radio

Chelyabinsk 

Vesti FM (VGTRK) 92.6 FM - News 24x7
(planned) Radio Kniga 93.0 FM - Cultural and Education
Radio Mayak (VGTRK) 93.6 FM - Talk radio
Radio MIR - 94.0 FM
Love Radio (SAFMAR Media) 94.6 FM - Top 40
Radio KP 95.3 FM - News/talk
NRJ Russia (Gazprom-Media) 96.0 FM - European and Russian pop music
Retro FM (EMG) 96.4 FM - Russian and Western 60-90s pop and rock hits
Detskoye Radio (Gazprom Media) 96.8 FM - Radio for kids (mostly music)
Radio Rossia (VGTRK) 97.8 FM - News/Talk
Radio Dacha (SAFMAR Media) 98.7 FM - Russian and Soviet pop hits
AvtoRadio (Gazprom-Media) 99.1 FM - Adult contemporary
Radio 100 - 100.0 FM
Radio Continental - 100.4 FM
Business FM (Rumedia) 100.8 FM - Talk radio
Yumor FM (Gazprom-Media) 101.2 FM - Russian contemporary pop music
Europa Plus (EMG) 101.6 FM - Pop music
Novoe radio (EMG) 102.0 FM - Russian pop music
Studio 21 (EMG) 102.4 FM - Hip-Hop & R&B music
Interwave - 102.9 FM
Nashe Radio (Multimedia Holding) - 103.5 FM
Russian Radio (RMG) 104.1 FM - Russian pop music
Radio Olymp (EKOR) - 104.5 FM
L-Radio - 104.9 FM
Radio 7 (EMG) 105.4 FM - Rock and pop hits (classical music hits on the top of each hour)
Radio Shanson (SAFMAR Media) 105.9 FM - Russian Shanson
Dorognoye Radio (EMG) 106.3 FM - Russian old music
Radio Vanya (M10 Media) 106.8 FM
DFM (RMG) 107.3 FM - Dance/Pop

Krasnoyarsk 

Comedy Radio (Gazprom-Media) 92.7 FM
Pi FM (MKR-Media) - 93.1 FM - Russian music remixes
Novoe radio (EMG) 93.5 FM - Russian pop music
Vesti FM (VGTRK) 94.0 FM - News 24x7
Radio Rossia (VGTRK) 94.5 FM - News/Talk
Like FM (Gazprom-Media) 95.0 FM - Interactive music radio
Radio Vera 95.4 FM - Religious
Radio Sibir (MKR-Media) - 95.8 FM - CHR Music
Krasnoyarsk FM (EKOR) 96.2 FM
Radio Zvezda 96.6 FM
Detskoye Radio (Gazprom Media) 97.0 FM - Radio for kids (mostly music)
Radio MIR - 97.4 FM
Radio 7 (EMG) 97.8 FM - Rock and pop hits (classical music hits on the top of each hour)
Yumor FM (Gazprom-Media) 98.2 FM - Russian contemporary pop music
Retro FM (EMG) 98.7 FM - Russian and Western 60-90s pop and rock hits
Radio 99.1 FM (EKOR) 99.1 FM
(planned) Radio Kniga 99.5 FM - Cultural and Education
Radio Record 100.3 FM - Dance music
Dorognoye Radio (EMG) 100.8 FM - Russian old music
Love Radio (SAFMAR Media) 101.3 FM - Top 40
Radio Shanson (SAFMAR Media) 101.7 FM - Russian Shanson
Silver Rain Radio  102.2 FM - Various
Krasnoyarsk Glavniy 102.8 FM - Music/Talk
NRJ Russia (Gazprom-Media) 103.3 FM - European and Russian pop music
Europa Plus (EMG) 103.8 FM - Pop music
Business FM (Rumedia) 104.2 FM - Talk radio
Radio Dacha (SAFMAR Media) 104.6 FM - Russian and Soviet pop hits
AvtoRadio (Gazprom-Media) 105.2 FM - Adult contemporary
Russian Radio (RMG) 105.8 FM - Russian pop music
Radio Mayak (VGTRK) 106.6 FM - Talk radio
Radio KP 107.1 FM - News/talk

Samara 

(planned) Radio Kniga 88.2 FM - Cultural and Education
Radio MIR - 88.7 FM
Radio Russkiy hit (SAFMAR Media) 89.2 FM - Contemporary pop
Novoe Radio (EMG) 89.6 FM - Russian pop music
Radio Monte-Carlo (RMG) 91.0 FM - Pop music
Business FM (Rumedia) 91.5 FM - Talk radio
Radio Mayak (VGTRK) 92.1 FM - Talk radio
Samara Guberniain Radio - 92.5 FM
Nashe Radio (Multimedia Holding) 92.9 FM - Russian rock
Vesti FM (VGTRK) 93.5 FM - News 24x7
Radio Rossia (VGTRK) 95.3 FM - News/Talk radio
Yumor FM (Gazprom-Media) 95.7 FM - Russian contemporary pop music
Radio Shanson (SAFMAR Media) 96.3 FM - Russian Shanson
Radio Vera - 96.8 FM
Dorognoye Radio (EMG) 97.3 FM - Russian old music
New Wave (Svezhiy veter) 97.8 FM
Radio KP 98.2 FM - News/talk
Retro FM (EMG) 98.6 FM - Russian and Western 60-90s pop and rock hits
(planned) Radio Sputnik (Rossiya Segodnya) 99.1 FM - News/talk
Europa Plus (EMG) 99.9 FM - Pop music
Russian Radio (RMG) 100.3 FM - Russian pop music
Marusia FM 101.0 FM
Radio Record 101.5 FM - Dance music
Radio Dacha (SAFMAR Media) 102.1 FM - Russian and Soviet pop hits
NRJ Russia (Gazprom-Media) 102.5 FM - European and Russian pop music
DFM (RMG) 102.9 FM - Dance/Pop
Radio Megapolis (EKOR) - 103.6 FM
Samara-Maximum (EKOR) - 104.3 FM
AvtoRadio (Gazprom-Media) 104.8 FM - Adult contemporary
Comedy Radio (Gazprom Media) 105.4 FM - Comedy Club Radio
Radio Vanya (M10 Media) 106.1 FM - Russian Pop
Love Radio (SAFMAR Media) 106.6 FM - Top 40
Detskoye Radio (Gazprom Media) 107.2 FM - Radio for kids (mostly music)

Ufa

UKV 
Ashkadar radiosi (Baskortostan State Broadcasting) 66.68 FM
Radio 1st channel 69.68 FM

FM 

Studio 21 (EMG) 87.8 FM - Hip-Hop & R&B music
NRJ Russia (Gazprom-Media) 88.2 FM - European and Russian pop music
(planned) Radio Kniga 88.7 FM - Cultural and Education
Radio Iskatel 89.0 FM
Radio Rossia (VGTRK) 89.5 FM - News/Talk radio
Detskoye Radio (Gazprom Media) 90.6 FM - Radio for kids (mostly music)
Radio Sputnik (Rossiya Segodnya) 91.1 FM - News/talk
DFM (RMG) 91.5 FM - Dance/Pop
(planned) Relax FM (Gazprom-Media) 92.0 FM - Music for relaxation
(planned) Radio 7 (EMG) 92.5 FM - Rock and pop hits (classical music hits on the top of each hour)
Radio Mayak (VGTRK) 100.6 FM - Talk radio
Novoe radio (EMG) 101.2 FM - Russian pop music
Radio 1st channel 101.6 FM
Vesti FM (VGTRK) 102.1 FM - News 24x7
Nashe Radio (Multimedia Holding) 102.5 FM - Russian rock
Roxana radiosi 103.0 FM
Comedy Radio (Gazprom Media) 103.5 FM - Comedy Club Radio
Retro FM (EMG) 104.0 FM - Russian and Western 60-90s pop and rock hits
Russian Radio (RMG) 104.5 FM - Russian pop music
Radio Dacha (SAFMAR Media) 105.0 FM - Russian and Soviet pop hits
Uldash radiosi (Bashkortostan State Broadcasting) 105.5 FM
Europa Plus (EMG) 106.0 FM - Pop music
AvtoRadio (Gazprom-Media) 106.5 FM - Adult contemporary
Sputnik FM (Bashkortostan State Broadcasting) 107.0 FM
Business FM (Rumedia) 107.5 FM - Talk radio
Dorognoye Radio (EMG) 107.9 FM - Russian old music

Rostov-na-Donu

UKV 

Nashe Radio (Multimedia Holding) - 73.76 FM

FM 

Detskoye Radio (Gazprom Media) 88.2 FM - Radio for kids (mostly music)
Radio Rossia (VGTRK) 89.0 FM - News/Talk radio
Radio 7 (EMG) 89.4 FM - Rock and pop hits (classical music hits on the top of each hour)
Radio KP 89.8 FM - News/talk
Vesti FM (VGTRK) 90.2 FM - News 24x7
Radio MIR - 90.6 FM
Yumor FM (Gazprom-Media) 91.2 FM - Russian contemporary pop music
Radio Mayak (VGTRK) 91.8 FM - Talk radio
(planned) Radio Vera 95.7 FM - Religious
(planned) Relax FM (Gazprom-Media) 98.5 FM - Music for relaxation
Hit FM (RMG) 100.1 FM - Contemporary Hits
FM-na-Donu 100.7 FM
Retro FM (EMG) 101.2 FM - Russian and Western 60-90s pop and rock hits
Love Radio (SAFMAR Media) 101.6 FM - Top 40
Dorognoye Radio (EMG) 102.2 FM - Russian old music
Russian Radio (RMG) 103.0 FM - Russian pop music
Radio Dacha (SAFMAR Media) 103.3 FM - Russian and Soviet pop hits
Radio Monte Carlo (RMG) 103.7 FM - Pop music
AvtoRadio (Gazprom-Media) 104.1 FM - Adult contemporary
DFM (RMG) 104.6 FM - Dance/Pop
Like FM (Gazprom-Media) 105.1 FM - Interactive music radio
Europa Plus (EMG) 105.7 FM - Pop music
NRJ Russia (Gazprom-Media) 106.6 FM - European and Russian pop music
(planned) Radio Kniga 107.1 FM - Cultural and Education
Novoe radio (EMG) 107.5 FM - Russian pop music

Omsk 

Radio Rossia (VGTRK) 87.7 FM - News/Talk radio
Radio Vanya (M10 Media) 88.1 FM - Russian Pop
Radio Mayak (VGTRK) 88.6 FM - Talk radio
NRJ Russia (Gazprom-Media) 89.1 FM - European and Russian pop music
Studio 21 (EMG) 89.5 FM - Hip-Hop & R&B music
(planned) Radio Kniga 90.1 FM - Cultural and Education
Radio Vera 90.5 FM - Religious/Classical
Radio MIR - 90.9 FM
Detskoye Radio (Gazprom Media) 91.4 FM - Radio for kids (mostly music)
(planned) Pi FM (MKR-Media) - 91.8 FM - Russian music remixes
(planned) Relax FM (Gazprom-Media) 92.3 FM - Music for relaxation
Nashe Radio (Multimedia Holding) 100.6 FM - Russian rock
Radio Dacha (SAFMAR Media) 101.0 FM - Russian and Soviet pop hits
Comedy Radio (Gazprom Media) 101.5 FM - Comedy Club Radio
Europa Plus (EMG) 101.9 FM - Pop music
Russian Radio (RMG) 102.5 FM - Russian pop music
Dorognoye Radio (EMG) 103.0 FM - Russian old music
Radio-3 - 103.5 FM
Radio Sibir (MKR-Media) - 103.9 FM - CHR Music
Radio Record 104.4 FM - Dance music
Radio MAXIMUM (RMG) 105.0 FM - Rock music
Retro FM (EMG) 105.7 FM - Russian and Western 60-90s pop and rock hits
Radio Monte-Carlo (RMG) 106.2 FM - Pop music
AvtoRadio (Gazprom-Media) 106.8 FM - Adult contemporary
Novoe radio (EMG) 107.3 FM - Russian pop music
Vesti FM (VGTRK) 107.8 FM - News 24x7

Krasnodar

UKV 
AvtoRadio (Gazprom-Media) 68.15 FM - Adult contemporary

FM 

Radio Zvezda 87.5 FM
Radio Vera 87.9 FM - Religious
Radio Dacha (SAFMAR Media) 88.3 FM - Russian and Soviet pop hits
Detskoye Radio (Gazprom Media) 88.7 FM - Radio for kids (mostly music)
Novoe radio (EMG) 89.3 FM - Russian pop music
Radio Kniga 89.7 FM - Cultural and Education
Radio Rossia (VGTRK) 90.2 FM - News/Talk radio
NRJ Russia (Gazprom-Media) 90.6 FM - European and Russian pop music
Radio KP 91.0 FM - News/talk
Radio Mayak (VGTRK) 91.4 FM - Talk radio
(planned) Comedy Radio (Gazprom Media) 96.9 FM - Comedy Club Radio
(planned) Radio Krasnodar 99.8 FM - Municipal radio
Vesti FM (VGTRK) 100.6 FM - News 24x7
Retro FM (EMG) 101.2 FM - Russian and Western 60-90s pop and rock hits
Russian Radio (RMG) 101.8 FM - Russian pop music
Europa Plus (EMG) 102.2 FM - Pop music
First radio of Kuban (Kuban24 state holding) 102.7 FM
AvtoRadio (Gazprom-Media) 103.2 FM - Adult contemporary
Dorognoye Radio (EMG) 103.7 FM - Russian old music
Hit FM (RMG) 104.2 FM - Contemporary Hits
Nashe Radio (Multimedia Holding) - 104.7 FM
Kazak FM (Kuban24 state holding) - 105.2 FM
DFM (RMG) 106.0 FM - Dance/Pop
Business FM 106.8 FM - All-news radio
Radio Rossia (VGTRK) 107.2 FM - News/Talk radio
Radio 107 - 107.7 FM CHR/Hits

Voronezh

UKV 
Radio Blagovestie 73.55 FM - Religious

FM 

Relax FM (Gazprom-Media) 94.9 FM - Music for relaxation
Radio Rossia (VGTRK) 95.9 FM - News/Talk radio
Vesti FM (VGTRK) 96.3 FM - News 24x7
(planned) Radio Kniga 96.8 FM - Cultural and Education
Radio KP 97.7 FM - News/talk
Radio Russkiy hit (SAFMAR Media) 98.1 FM - Contemporary pop
Novoe radio (EMG) 98.5 FM - Russian pop music
Yumor FM (Gazprom-Media) 99.1 FM - Russian contemporary pop music
Detskoye Radio (Gazprom Media) 99.5 FM - Radio for kids (mostly music)
Radio MIR - 99.9 FM
Europa Plus (EMG) 100.3 FM - Pop music
Nashe Radio (Multimedia Holding) - 100.7 FM
NRJ Russia (Gazprom-Media) 101.1 FM - European and Russian pop music
Radio 7 (EMG) 101.6 FM - Rock and pop hits (classical music hits on the top of each hour)
Dorognoye Radio (EMG) 102.3 FM - Russian old music
Radio Shanson (SAFMAR Media) 102.8 FM - Russian Shanson
AvtoRadio (Gazprom-Media) 103.4 FM - Adult contemporary
Love Radio (SAFMAR Media) 103.8 FM - Pop music
DFM (RMG) 104.3 FM - Dance/Pop
Russian Radio (RMG) 104.8 FM - Russian pop music
Retro FM (EMG) 105.3 FM - Russian and Western 60-90s pop and rock hits
Radio Mayak (VGTRK) 105.7 FM - Talk radio
Radio MAXIMUM (RMG) 106.1 FM - Rock music
Kanal Melodiya Voronezh 106.8 FM
Radio Borneo 107.2 FM
Radio Dacha (SAFMAR Media) 107.6 FM - Russian and Soviet pop hits

Perm

UKV 
Radio Orpheus 66.80 FM - Classical

FM 

Detskoye Radio (Gazprom Media) 87.6 FM - Radio for kids (mostly music)
Bolid FM 88.0 FM
Vesti FM (VGTRK) 88.5 FM - News 24x7
Yumor FM (Gazprom-Media) 88.9 FM - Russian contemporary pop music
Europa Plus (EMG) 89.4 FM - Pop music
Comedy Radio (Gazprom-Media) 89.8 FM
Radio Rossia (VGTRK) 90.2 FM - News/Talk radio
AvtoRadio (Gazprom-Media) 90.7 FM - Adult contemporary
Radio Sputnik (Rossiya Segodnya) 91.2 FM - News/talk
Pioner FM 91.8 FM - Retro music
Radio Zvezda 92.7 FM
Like FM (Gazprom-Media) 93.1 FM - Interactive music radio
Pi FM (MKR-Media) - 93.9 FM - Russian music remixes
Radio Vera 95.0 FM - Religious
Radio MIR - 95.4 FM
Novoe radio (EMG) 95.8 FM - Russian pop music
Radio Mayak (VGTRK) 96.2 FM - Talk radio
Radio KP 96.6 FM - News/talk
NRJ Russia (Gazprom-Media) 97.6 FM - European and Russian pop music
(planned) Radio Iskatel 98.0 FM
Radio Dacha (SAFMAR Media) 98.4 FM - Russian and Soviet pop hits
Silver Rain Radio 98.9 FM - Various
Retro FM (EMG) 99.4 FM - Russian and Western 60-90s pop and rock hits
Nashe Radio (Multimedia Holding) - 100.0 FM
Hit FM (RMG) 100.7 FM - Contemporary Hits
Radio 7 (EMG) 101.1 FM - Rock and pop hits (classical music hits on the top of each hour)
Radio Nostalgie 101.5 FM
Dorognoye Radio (EMG) 102.0 FM - Russian old music
DFM (RMG) 102.7 FM - Dance/Pop
Radio MAXIMUM (RMG) 103.2 FM - Rock music
Radio Pilot (EKOR) 103.6 FM
Radio Alfa (EKOR) 104.1 FM
Radio Record 104.7 FM - Dance music
Relax FM (Gazprom-Media) 105.1 FM - Music for relaxation
(planned) Radio Kniga 105.6 FM - Cultural and Education
Russian Radio (RMG) 106.2 FM - Russian pop music
Love Radio (SAFMAR Media) 106.7 FM - Pop music
Radio Monte Carlo (RMG) 107.2 FM - Pop music

Volgograd

UKV 
Radio Orpheus 71.33 FM - Classical

FM 

Radio Vera 92.6 FM - Religious/Classical
Volgograd 24 (VGTRK) 93.4 FM
Radio MIR - 93.8 FM
DFM (RMG) 94.5 FM - Dance/Pop
Radio 7 (EMG) 94.9 FM - Rock and pop hits (classical music hits on the top of each hour)
Radio Mayak (VGTRK) 95.3 FM - Talk radio
Detskoye Radio (Gazprom Media) 95.7 FM - Radio for kids (mostly music)
Love Radio (SAFMAR Media) 96.1 FM - Pop music
Radio KP 96.5 FM - News/talk
Nashe Radio (Multimedia Holding) - 97.2 FM
Radio Dacha (SAFMAR Media) 97.6 FM - Russian and Soviet pop hits
Radio Rossia (VGTRK) 98.3 FM - News/Talk radio
NRJ Russia (Gazprom-Media) 98.8 FM - European and Russian pop music
Radio MAXIMUM (RMG) 99.2 FM - Rock music
Radio Zvezda 99.6 FM
Radio Shanson (SAFMAR Media) 100.0 FM - Russian Shanson
Europa Plus (EMG) 100.6 FM - Pop music
(planned) Radio Sputnik (Rossiya Segodnya) 101.1 FM - News/talk
Volgograd FM (EKOR) 101.5 FM
New Wave (Svezhiy veter) 102.0 FM
Retro FM (EMG) 102.6 FM - Russian and Western 60-90s pop and rock hits
AvtoRadio (Gazprom-Media) 103.1 FM - Adult contemporary
Dorognoye Radio (EMG) 103.6 FM - Russian old music
Novoe radio (EMG) 104.0 FM - Russian pop music
Yumor FM (Gazprom-Media) 104.5 FM - Russian contemporary pop music
Sputnik FM (EKOR) 105.1 FM
Russian Radio (RMG) 105.6 FM - Russian pop music
Studio 21 (EMG) 106.0 FM - Hip-Hop & R&B music
Radio Kniga 106.4 FM - Cultural and Education
Vesti FM (VGTRK) 106.8 FM - News 24x7
Comedy Radio (Gazprom-Media) 107.2 FM
Silver Rain Radio 107.9 FM - Various

Outside of Russia

International

Radio Svoboda 1386 AM (18:30-21:00 UTC) - 24x7 linear radio-station RFE/RL's Russian service
China Radio International Russian service AM-network and shortwave network
Radio Taiwan International in shortwave
Voice of Korea (Pyongyang) in shortwave
KBS World Radio 1170 AM & shortwave
NHK World Radio Japan 1386 AM & shortwave
Vatican Radio in shortwave
Deutsche Welle 1386 AM (18:00-18:30 UTC)
Radio Poland 1386 AM (16:00-16:30 UTC)
Radio Ukraine International 1386 AM (21:00-21:20 UTC)
Radio Romania International in shortwave (analogue and DRM)
Voice of Vietnam in shortwave
Voice of Tajik 1143 AM & shortwave (8:00-10:00 UTC)
Pars Today 702 AM & 1449 AM
TRT Voice of Turkey in shortwave (14:00-15:00 UTC)
Radio Cairo in shortwave (19:00-20:00 UTC)
Radio Lenta 1557 AM (15:30-21:30 UTC)
Trans World Radio 621 AM (Europe), 864 AM (Caucasus) and 612 AM (Central Asia)
Radio Eli 1035 AM
Radio Tsentr 1602 AM
FEBC Radio Teos 1566 AM and shortwave
HCJB in shortwave (4:00-5:00 and 9:00-14:00 UTC)
KNLS/Madagascar World Voice in shortwave (9:00-10:00, 11:00-12:00 and 15:00-2:00 UTC)

Australia

SBS Radio 2 - National multilingual broadcaster, with regular Russian language programs.

Canada

CKER-FM Edmonton, Alberta, Canada; 107.1 -Sundays 21:00, music, news for Russians in Canada
Voice of Alberta  106.7 FM - Chat, news/talk, music. Russian speaking community in Calgary, Alberta, Canada.

United States

 Echo Planety  1240 AM - Chat, news/talk, music. Chicago, United States.
Dr. Koles' weekly talk show 1430 AM - Physical and psychological health. Chicago, United States.
 Narodnaya Volna Radio  1430 AM - Chat, news/talk, music. Chicago, United States.
New Life Russian Radio 1330 AM - pop music, news/talk, first Russian station in the United States, Chicago. 
 i-netradio.com 24hrs/7 - Chat, news/talk, music. Florida, United States.
 Vashe Radio  1240 AM - Chat, news/talk, music. Chicago, United States.
 KXPD 1040 AM - news/talk, music. Portland, Oregon, United States.
 KXET 1520 AM - Christian, news/talk. Portland, Oregon, United States.
 WSNR 620 AM. New York, New York, United States.
 Arti Gian FM 2  Pop,Eurodance. Hanover, Germany.

United Kingdom

Radio Matryoshka - DAB+ station in London

Spain

Russkoe Radio - Benidorm 106.0 FM, Tenerife 105.0 FM & 105.9 FM
Radio Matryoshka - Benidorm 99.9 FM, Marbella 98.3 FM
RusRadio Marbella - Marbella-Estepona 106.2 FM

Germany

Radio Golos Berlina - Berlin 97.2 FM.

Austria

 Radio RU - DAB+ station in Wien

Estonia

 Raadio 4 - Chat, news/talk, music. Russian speaking community in Estonia.
 Narodnoe Radio (FM in Tallinn, Kohtla-Jarve and Narva, DAB+ in Tallinn, Pehka and Koeru) - Chat, news/talk, music. Russian speaking community in Estonia.
 DFM Estonia (FM in Tallinn and Narva, DAB+ in Tallinn, Pehka and Koeru) - Music. Russian speaking community in Estonia.
 Radio Volna  - Music. Russian speaking community in Estonia.
 Russkoe Radio Estonia - Chat, news/talk, music. Russian speaking community in Estonia.
 Sky Radio - Music. Russian speaking community in Estonia.
 Yumor FM Estonia - Chat, music. Russian speaking community in Estonia.
 Radio Eli - Religious. FM in Narva and Kohtla-Jarve.

Latvia

 Latvijas Radio 4 - News, all thematic programms and music
 SWH Plus - Russian language music hits
 EHR Russkie hity - Russian music
 Retro FM Latvia - Retro music
 TOP Radio - Dance music/Russian hits
 Avtoradio Latvia - Music hits (Riga 103.2 and Kraslava 96.1 FM)
 Radio Roks - Russian rock (Riga 88.6 FM)
 Radio Baltkom - News&Talk (Riga 93.9 FM and Ventspils 88.5 FM)
 Mix FM - Music from 90's (Riga 102.7 FM)
 Lounge FM - Lounge&Jazz music (Riga 99.5 FM)
 Radio Skonto Plus - Russian language music station (Riga 102.3 FM)
 Radio 9 - Pop music (Jurmala 99.0 FM)
 Radio Rezekne - Music and news (Rezekne 105.1 FM)
 Alise Plus - Music and news (Daugavpils 101.6 FM)

Lithuania

 Radio R - Russian speaking community in Lithuania.
 Radio Raduga - local station in Klaipedia 100.8 FM

Cyprus

Russkoe radio - FM-network in Cyprus.

Israel

 Kan Reka - Mostly russian-language all-thematic station.
 Luchshee radio - Haifa 106.4 FM
 Pervoe radio - Ashdod 89.1 FM

External links
Moscow FM Stations Guide
Radio of Russia
Radio Archive
Victor City FM Radio Stations 

Lists of radio stations by language